is a collaborative studio album by the Japanese free jazz saxophonist Akira Sakata, American experimental guitarist Jim O'Rourke, improv duo Chikamorachi (drummer Chris Corsano and double bassist Darin Gray), and Japanese noise musician Merzbow.

Track listing
CD

LP

Personnel
All personnel credits adapted from the album notes.

Musicians
Akira Sakata – alto saxophone, vocals
Jim O'Rourke – electric guitar, harmonica, electronics
Chris Corsano – drums
Darin Gray – double bass, percussion
Masami Akita – noise electronics

Technical personnel
Jeremy Kannapell – collage, jacket design
Dan Zettwoch – layout assistance, rendering
Rashad Becker – lacquer cutting, mastering [vinyl version]

References

External links
Flying Basket at Family Vineyard
"Flying Basket (excerpt)" at SoundCloud

2015 albums
Collaborative albums
Free improvisation albums
Jim O'Rourke (musician) albums
Merzbow albums